Statistics of Ekstraklasa in the 1981–82 season.

Overview
16 teams competed in the 1981–82 season. Widzew Łódź won the championship.

League table

Results

Top goalscorers

References

External links
 Poland – List of final tables at RSSSF 

Ekstraklasa seasons
1981–82 in Polish football
Pol